Webuye East is a constituency in Kenya. It is one of nine constituencies in Bungoma County.

Members Of Parliament

References 

Constituencies in Bungoma County